The Du Cane Range is a mountain range in the Central Highlands region of Tasmania, Australia.

Major peaks in the range include The Acropolis, Mount Geryon, The Parthenon, Mount Eros, Mount Hyperion, Mount Massif, Mount Achilles, and Falling Mountain.

The range is a major feature of the Cradle Mountain-Lake St Clair National Park, and is a popular venue with bushwalkers and mountain climbers.

The Du Cane Range was named in honour of Sir Charles Du Cane, the Governor of Tasmania from 1874 to 1878.

See also

 List of highest mountains of Tasmania

References

External links
 Parks Tasmania
 

Mountain ranges of Tasmania
Central Highlands (Tasmania)
Cradle Mountain-Lake St Clair National Park